The Union School in Natchez was the first public, co-educational school by the city for African American students formed in 1871 and closed c. 1925, and was located at the southeast corner of North Union and Monroe Streets in Natchez, Mississippi.

History 
The Union School was established in 1871 as a brick building and it had thirteen rooms which held up to 948 children. The school opened in the fall of 1871, led by Theodore H. Greene and employed 9 black teachers, with the enrollment of 406 students. In 1887, the school was led by principal John S. Meekins, with enrollment of 267 students. By 1909, the school had enrollment of 1,175 students. In 1924, the lower grade levels had as many as 120 students in a single classroom, which prompted the school board to plea with the mayor to make changes.

In 1925, the Brumfield High School, another African American public school in Natchez, was built to alleviate the overcrowding. The school namesake was George Washington Brumfield (1866–1927) who had taught classes at the Union School and served as a principal, after his arrival to Natchez in the 1890s. Brumfield also served as the Sunday school teacher at Zion Chapel African Methodist Episcopal Church (Zion Chapel AME Church).

The Union School operated during a period of racial segregation in Mississippi. The Natchez Institute was the first public school by the city for white-only students, established in 1845. By 1950s, the Union School building was demolished. The school is included in the "African American Public Education, Natchez Trails" historical marker at its former site.

See also 
 History of Natchez, Mississippi
 Natchez Junior College, historically black college opened in 1884

References 

Public schools in Mississippi
Schools in Adams County, Mississippi
Buildings and structures in Natchez, Mississippi
Educational institutions established in 1871
1871 establishments in Mississippi
Historically segregated African-American schools in Mississippi